Macalister Mansion is a 100-year-old mansion in George Town, Penang, Malaysia; it has been conserved and adapted as a hotel. 

Its name honours Penang's British Governor Colonel Norman Macalister, who was lost at sea in 1810, when Penang was still known as "Prince of Wales Isle". Macalister Mansion was designed by Ministry of Design, a Singaporean-owned architecture firm. It occupies 1,700 square meters, and renovation was completed in 2012.

References

Buildings and structures in George Town, Penang